No. 250 (Sudan) Squadron RAF was a Royal Air Force squadron formed as a reconnaissance and anti–submarine unit in the First World War and a fighter unit in the Second World War.

History

No. 250 Squadron was formed on 10 May 1918 at Padstow from Nos.494, 500, 501, 502 and 503 Flights for coastal reconnaissance duties over the Bristol Channel and its approaches. Equipped with a mixture of D.H.6s and D.H.9s, it flew anti-submarine patrols until the Armistice and disbanded on 31 May 1919.

On 1 April 1941, No.250 reformed at RAF Aqir from K Flight as No.250 (Sudan) Squadron and by the end of the month had received enough Tomahawks to become operational on defensive duties in Palestine. In May, a detachment began offensive sweeps over Syria and in June began operations in the Western Desert, being withdrawn in February 1942 for defensive operations. After converting to Kittyhawks, it returned to the desert in April as a fighter bomber unit and provided support for the 8th Army, advancing with it through Libya into Tunisia to end the North African campaign. In July 1943, the squadron flew to Malta to support the landings in Sicily moving there a few days afterwards. By mid-September it had occupied airfields in Italy where it spent the rest of the war flying fighter bomber missions. In August 1945, No.260 Squadron disbanded and transferred its Mustangs to No.250 which then flew them until disbanded on 30 December 1946 at Treviso, in Italy.

Squadron badge
The squadron's badge was adorned with a River Eagle, a bird native to Sudan, and the motto Close to the sun. The squadron was donated by the British community in Sudan when it was reformed in 1941.

References

Sources

External links

250
Military units and formations in Mandatory Palestine in World War II